A linguist is someone who engages in the academic discipline of linguistics. Due to social and institutional forces, women in linguistics have been marginalized leading to significant interest in both the causes of and solutions to gender bias in linguistics.



A
Abbi, Anvita  Indian linguist, scholar
Abbott, Barbara  American linguist
Adamou, Evangelia  Contact linguist and specialist in endangered languages
Aikhenvald, Alexandra  Linguist
Aissen, Judith Linguist and Mayan specialist
Aitchison, Jean  Linguist and writer
Alexiadou, Artemis  Greek linguist and syntactician
Allen, Shanley  Canadian linguist and acquisitionist
Anagnostopoulou, Elena  Greek linguist and syntactician
Antas, Jolanta  Polish linguist
Archangeli, Diana  American linguist
Ariel, Mira  Israeli linguist, developer of Accessibility Theory
Armstrong, Lilias (1882–1937) British phonetician
Ashraf, Syeda Ummehani  Linguist
Atkins, Beryl  Professional lexicographer

B
Bagchi, Tista  Indian linguist and ethicist
Baird, Jessie Little Doe  Indigenous linguist and revitalization specialist
Bannon, Ann (b. 1932)  Lesbian pulp fiction author and linguist
Baptista, Marlyse Cape Verdean contact linguist
Barber, Katherine British-born Canadian lexicographer
Bardovi-Harlig, Kathleen  American applied linguist
Baron, Naomi  American linguist and digital communication specialist
Bartsch, Renate  German linguist and philosopher of language
Bazzanella, Carla  Italian pragmaticist and sociolinguist
Beckman, Mary  American linguist, prosodist and acquisitionist
Beddor, Patrice
Bell, Jeannie  Australian specialist in Aboriginal languages
Bellugi, Ursula  German-American linguist and cognitive neuroscientist
Berez-Kroeker, Andrea  American documentary linguist
Berezovich, Elena  Russian onomastician and ethnolinguist
Berg, Helma van den  Dutch linguist and Caucasian specialist
Bergman, Brita  Swedish signed-language linguist
Berko Gleason, Jean American psycholinguist and Wug Test creator
Berman, Ruth A.  South African-Israeli linguist and Hebraicist
Bermúdez, Eloína Miyares  Cuban linguist and lexicographer
Bernot, Denise  French linguist and Burmese specialist
Biagi, Maria Luisa Altieri  Italian historical linguist
Bishop, Judith  Australian poet, linguist and translator
Blake, Renée A.  Caribbean American sociolinguist
Blau, Joyce Egyptian-French linguist and Kurdish specialist
Bleek, Dorothea  South African-born German anthropologist and philologist
Blevins, Juliette
Blumstein, Sheila
Borer, Hagit  Israeli-born American theoretical linguist and syntactician
Bowerman, Melissa  Max-Planck-based American acquisitionist/psycholinguist
Bowern, Claire  US-based Australian historical linguist
Boyce, Mary  British linguist and specialist in Iranian languages and Zoroastrianism
Brentari, Diane  American linguist and sign-language specialist
Bresnan, Joan  American syntactician and founder of Lexical-Functional Grammar
Briggs, Jean  American-born anthropologist, ethnographer and linguist
Bril, Isabelle French linguist and typologist specialising in Austronesian languages
Bromwich, Rachel  British philologist and Celtic specialist
Broselow, Ellen  American experimental linguist
Browman, Catherine  American linguist and speech scientist
Brown, Penelope  American anthropological linguist
Brugman, Til  Dutch author, poet and linguist
Buchi, Éva  Swiss linguist, lexicographer and Romance specialist
Bucholtz, Mary  American sociolinguist and anthropological linguist
Bull, Tove  Norwegian linguist, first female rector of the University of Tromsø
Burlak, Svetlana  Russian linguist and Indo-Europeanist
Burridge, Kate  Australian linguist and Germanicist
Butt, Miriam  German computational linguist and syntactician
Bybee, Joan American linguist, pioneer of the usage-based approach

C 
Cacoullos, Rena Torres
Cameron, Deborah
Canger, Una
Cassell, Justine
Catach, Nina
Cataldi, Lee
Catrileo, María
Charity Hudley, Anne H.
Chaski, Carole
Chen, Yiya Phonetician and prosody specialist
Cheng, Lisa
Cheshire, Jenny
Chevalier, Marion Frances
Choi, Soonja
Chomsky, Carol
Choueiri, Lina
Chowning, Ann
Christensen, Kirsti Koch
Chuilleanáin, Eiléan Ní
Chung, Sandra
Cirlot, Victoria
Clark, Dymphna
Clark, Eve V.
Cole, Jennifer S.
Condee, Nancy
Contini-Morava, Ellen
Couper-Kuhlen, Elizabeth
Cowper, Elizabeth
Crago, Martha
Crowhurst, Megan

D 
Davies, Anna Morpurgo
Davis, Jenny L.
D'Costa, Jean
de Castro, Yeda Pessoa
de Guzman, Maria Odulio
Deloria, Ella Cara
Dent, Susie
de Malkiel, María Rosa Lida
Dino, Güzin
Dolphyne, Florence Ghanaian linguist
Dorian, Nancy
Doron, Edit
Doron, Helen
Downing, Laura J.
Dragićević, Rajna
Duarte, Dulce Almada
Dürscheid, Christa
Dwyer, Arienne

E 
Eckert, Penelope
Ehrlich, Susan
Eichholz, Vilma Sindona
 É. Kiss, Katalin
Elgin, Suzette Haden
Elizarenkova, Tatyana
Emmorey, Karen
Engberg-Pedersen, Elisabeth
Engdahl, Elisabet
England, Nora
Ergun, Zeynep
Erlés, Patricia Esteban
Ernestus, Mirjam Dutch psycholinguist and laboratory phonologist
Erofeyeva, Tamara
Ervin-Tripp, Susan M.
Eskildsen, Rosario María Gutiérrez

F 
Faber, Pamela
Farion, Iryna
Fellbaum, Christiane
Fielding, Stephanie
Fierz-David, Linda
Fiesel, Eva
Fischer-Jørgensen, Eli
Fitzgerald, Colleen
Fjeld, Ruth Vatvedt
Florey, Margaret
Fodor, Janet Dean
Foster, Mary LeCron
Frazier, Lyn
Freidenberg, Olga
Frolova, Olga
Fromkin, Victoria

G 
Gabain, Annemarie von
Gabanyi, Anneli Ute
Gal, Susan
Gelashvili, Naira
Genetti, Carol
Gerdts, Donna
Gezundhajt, Henriette
Ghomeshi, Jila
Gleitman, Lila
Glisan, Eileen
Glushkova, Irina
Goldberg, Adele
Goldin-Meadow, Susan
Goodman, Felicitas
Gopnik, Myrna
Green, Lisa
Grigore, Delia
Groll, Sarah Israelit
Grønnum, Nina
Gvishiani, Natalia

H 
Haas, Mary
Haessler, Luise
Hajičová, Eva
Hakulinen, Auli
Hall, Kira
Hansen, Maj-Britt Mosegaard
Harley, Heidi
Harris, Alice
Harrison, Jane Ellen
Hasan, Ruqaiya
Hasdeu, Iulia
Hasluck, Margaret
Hatcher, Anna Granville
Heath, Shirley Brice
Heim, Irene
Heller, Monica
Hercus, Luise
Hermon, Gabriella
Herring, Susan
Hidasi, Judit
Hildebrandt, Martha
Hill, Elizabeth
Hill, Jane H.
Hinton, Leanne
Hoff, Erika
Holmes, Janet
Holst, Clara
Holtsmark, Anne
Hume, Elizabeth V.
Humphreys, Jennett
Hyams, Nina

I 
Iatridou, Sabine
Inkelas, Sharon
Irigaray, Luce
Itō, Junko
Ivars, Ann-Marie

J 
Jacobson, Pauline
Jaszczolt, Katarzyna
Jeanne, LaVerne
Jefferson, Gail
Jelinek, Eloise
Jensen, Eva Skafte
Jinfang, Li
Jobbé-Duval, Brigitte
Jones, Eliza Grew

K 
Kachru, Yamuna
Kahane, Renée
Kaisse, Ellen
Kapeliuk, Olga
Karg-Gasterstädt, Elisabeth 
Karpelès, Suzanne 
Karttunen, Frances
Keating, Patricia
Kepping, Ksenia
Kevelson, Roberta
Kilham, Hannah
Kipfer, Barbara Ann
Kirkness, Verna
Klepfisz, Irena
Kober, Alice
Koptjevskaja-Tamm, Maria Typologist and editor-in-chief of Linguistic Typology
Kordić, Snježana
Korkmaz, Zeynep
Kormos, Judit
Kornfilt, Jaklin
Kozhina, Margarita
Kramer, Christina
Kratzer, Angelika
Kropp Dakubu, Mary Esther

L 
Laakso, Johanna
Lafkioui, Mena
Lahiri, Aditi
Lakoff, Robin
Lambton, Ann
Lanehart, Sonja L.
Larsen-Freeman, Diane
Lasch, Agathe
Lastra, Yolanda
Legate, Julie Anne
Lehiste, Ilse
Levin, Beth
Lillo-Martin, Diane
Lippi, Rosina
Lloyd, Lucy
Los, Bettelou

M 
Macaulay, Monica
Majid, Asifa
Maling, Joan
Malzahn, Melanie
Manzini, Maria Rita
Marchello-Nizia, Christiane
Marika, Raymattja
Martineau, France
Martinez, Esther
Massam, Diane
Massignon, Geneviève
Masterman, Margaret
Mayberry, Rachel
Mazdapour, Katayun
McConnell-Ginet, Sally
McKay, Sandra Lee
McKean, Erin
McMahon, April
Meakins, Felicity
Meiman-Kitrossky, Inna
Mendoza-Denton, Norma
Menn, Lise
Menyuk, Paula
Mestergazi, Elena
Metslang, Helle
Meyerhoff, Miriam
Michaelis, Laura
Michaelis, Susanne Maria
Mierzejewska, Halina
Milroy, Lesley
Mints, Zara
Mithun, Marianne
Moliner, María
Moltmann, Friederike
Morford, Jill
Morison, Odille
Moure, Teresa
Munro, Pamela
Murphy, Lynne
Muscă, Mona
Myers-Scotton, Carol

N 
Nábělková, Mira
Napier, Susan J.
Napoli, Donna Jo
Nemni, Monique
Nichols, Johanna
Nielsen, Harriet Bjerrum
Nuzhat, Shaista

O 
Okrent, Arika
Olsen, Birgit Anette
O'Shea, Natalia
Ozanne-Rivierre, Françoise
Özsoy, A. Sumru
Özyürek, Aslı

P 
Padden, Carol
Partee, Barbara
Pätsch, Gertrud
Pavilionienė, Marija Aušrinė
Pavlenko, Aneta
Perkins, Ellavina
Perret, Michèle
Perstølen, Einfrid
Pierrehumbert, Janet
Piller, Ingrid
Piirainen, Elisabeth
Polinsky, Maria
Poplack, Shana
Pou, Saveros
Prince, Ellen
Proskouriakoff, Tatiana
Pusch, Luise F.

Q 
Qiriazi, Parashqevi
Queen, Robin

R 
Rakeei, Fatemeh
Ramchand, Gillian
Rauch, Irmengard
Ravid, Dorit
Reinhart, Tanya
Reutner, Ursula
Rey-Debove, Josette
Reynolds, Barbara
Rialland, Annie
Rice, Keren
Rivers, Wilga
Romaine, Suzanne
Ronat, Mitsou
Rošker, Jana S.
Rowlands, Jane Helen

S 
Sabatini, Alma
Sadiqi, Fatima
Safavi, Azarmi Dukht
Sakaguchi, Alicja
Sakayan, Dora
Samant, Satvasheela
Sampson, Hazel
Sandler, Wendy
Sankoff, Gillian
Saubel, Katherine Siva
Saunders, Irene
Schieffelin, Bambi
Schilling, Natalie
Seki, Lucy
Selkirk, Elisabeth O.
Semino, Elena
Shakryl, Tamara
Sharma, Devyani
Shaw, Patricia Alice
Shepard-Kegl, Judy
Shvedova, Natalia
Siewierska, Anna
Simpson, Jane
Širola, Dorjana
Sjoestedt, Marie-Louise
Skutnabb-Kangas, Tove
Smith, Adeline
Snell-Hornby, Mary
Sorace, Antonella
Sova, Lyubov
Sovran, Tamar
Sow, Salamatou
Steriade, Donca
Stollznow, Karen
Sullivan, Thelma D.
Swain, Merrill
Sweetser, Eve
Syrett, Kristen

T 
Tagliamonte, Sali
Tambroni, Clotilde
Tannen, Deborah
Tarlinskaja, Marina
Tarone, Elaine
Tarpent, Marie-Lucie
Tenenbaum, Joan M.
Thomas, M. Carey
Thomason, Sarah
Thompson, Sandra
Timm, Erika
Tracy, Rosemarie
Traugott, Elizabeth C.
Tu, Joan Lee
Turville-Petre, Joan

U 
Ulhicun, Aisin-Gioro
Uri, Helene

V 
Vainikka, Anna
Vaissière, Jacqueline
van Dijk, Marijn
van Kemenade, Ans
Varlamova, Galina
Verspoor, Marjolijn
Vojtko, Margaret Mary

W 
Walden, Tsvia
Walter, Henriette
Ward, Ida C.
Wąsik, Elżbieta Magdalena
Watahomigie, Lucille
White, Lydia
Wierzbicka, Anna
Williamson, Kay
Wodak, Ruth
Wray, Alison
Wurmbrand, Susi

X

Y 
Yartseva, Viktoria
Yee, Mary
Yershova, Galina
Yip, Moira
Yip, Virginia
Young-Scholten, Martha

Z 
Zaenen, Annie
Zanuttini, Raffaella
Zassenhaus, Hiltgunt
Zepeda, Ofelia
Zeshan, Ulrike
Zhang, Niina Ning
Žic-Fuchs, Milena
Zsiga, Elizabeth
Zubizarreta, M.-L.
Zuengler, Jane

References

Further reading

See also 
 List of linguists
 Lists of women

Lists of women by occupation
Women linguists